Augustus Johnson may refer to:

 Augustus S. Johnson, Michigan politician
 Gus Johnson (sportscaster) (Augustus Cornelius Johnson Jr., born 1967), American sportscaster
 J. Augustus Johnson, American consul in Beirut